A Single Life is a 1985 Australian film directed by John Power and starring Tina Bursill and Steve Jacobs. The plot concerns a 35-year-old woman who decides to have a baby.

References

External links
A Single Life at Peter Malone

Australian television films
1985 films
1980s English-language films
Films directed by John Power